Tetraphenylcyclopentadienone is an organic compound with the formula (C6H5)4C4CO. It is a dark purple to black crystalline solid that is soluble in organic solvents.  It is an easily made building block for many organic and organometallic compounds.

Structure
The C5O core of the molecule is planar and conjugated, but the bonds have a definite alternating single- and double-bond nature.  The C2–C3 and C4–C5 distances are 1.35 Å, while the C1–C2, C3–C4, C5–C1 are closer to single bonds with distances near 1.50 Å.  The phenyl groups of tetraphenylcyclopentadienone adopt a "propeller" shape in its 3D conformation. The four phenyl rings are rotated out of the plane of the central ring because of steric repulsion with each other.

Synthesis
Tetraphenylcyclopentadienone can be synthesized by a double aldol condensation involving benzil and dibenzyl ketone in the presence of a basic catalyst.

Reactions
The central ring can act as a diene in Diels–Alder reactions with various dienophiles. For example, reaction with benzyne leads to 1,2,3,4-tetraphenylnaphthalene and reaction with diphenylacetylene leads to hexaphenylbenzene. In this way, it is a precursor to graphene-like molecules, such as coronene.

Similarly, pentaphenylpyridine derivatives may be prepared via a Diels–Alder reaction between tetraphenylcyclopentadienone and benzonitrile.

Tetraphenylcyclopentadienone can provide an effective alternative to DDQ in aromatization of parts of porphyrin structures:

Ligand in organometallic chemistry

Tetraarylcyclopentadienones are a well studied class of ligands in organometallic chemistry.  The Shvo catalyst, useful for certain hydrogenations, is derived from tetraphenylcyclopentadienone.

See also 
 Cyclopentadienone

References

Enones
Phenyl compounds
Cyclopentadienes